Krisda Putri Aprilia is an Indonesian karateka. She won the gold medal in the women's individual kata event at the 2019 Southeast Asian Games held in the Philippines.

In June 2021, she competed at the World Olympic Qualification Tournament held in Paris, France hoping to qualify for the 2020 Summer Olympics in Tokyo, Japan. In November 2021, she competed in the women's individual kata event at the World Karate Championships held in Dubai, United Arab Emirates.

She won the silver medal in the women's individual kata event at the 2021 Asian Karate Championships held in Almaty, Kazakhstan. She won one of the bronze medals in the women's individual kata event at the 2021 Islamic Solidarity Games held in Konya, Turkey.

She lost her bronze medal match at the 2022 Asian Karate Championships held in Tashkent, Uzbekistan.

Achievements

References

External links 
 

Living people
1999 births
Place of birth missing (living people)
Indonesian female karateka
Southeast Asian Games medalists in karate
Southeast Asian Games gold medalists for Indonesia
Southeast Asian Games bronze medalists for Indonesia
Competitors at the 2019 Southeast Asian Games
Competitors at the 2021 Southeast Asian Games
Islamic Solidarity Games medalists in karate
Islamic Solidarity Games competitors for Indonesia
21st-century Indonesian women